{{Infobox radio station
| name             = WDPW
| logo             =
| city             = Greenville, Michigan
| area             = 
| branding         = Power 91.9
| airdate          = 
| frequency        = 91.9 MHz
| format           = Urban contemporary gospel
| erp              = 4,000 watts
| haat             = 63 meters
| class            = A
| facility_id      = 121790
| callsign_meaning = PoweR'
| former_callsigns = 
| affiliations     = 
| owner            = Larlen Communications Inc.
| licensee         = Larlen Communications Inc.
| sister_stations  = 
| webcast          = 
| website          = power919.org 
}}WDPW''' (91.9 FM), better known as Power 91.9 "The People's Choice", broadcasts an Urban contemporary gospel format that serves the Grand Rapids, Michigan market. WDPW 91.9 FM went on the air officially in November 2009. The station broadcasts at 4,000 watts of power. It is licensed to nearby Greenville, MI. Power 91.9 WDPW is owned by Larlen Communications.

Sources

WDPW on FCCInfo.com

External
 WDPW Website
 

DPW
Radio stations established in 1990
Gospel radio stations in the United States